Alopoglossus brevifrontalis, Boulenger's largescale lizard, is a species of lizard in the family Alopoglossidae. It is found in Ecuador, Peru, Bolivia, Brazil, Colombia, Venezuela, Guyana, and Suriname.

References

Alopoglossus
Reptiles described in 1912
Taxa named by George Albert Boulenger
Taxobox binomials not recognized by IUCN